Mexitli, Mexi, or Mezih was a legendary great leader and war priest of the Aztecs (before they became known as the Mexica, possibly in his honor) during the wandering years. According to Bernardino de Sahagún, the name derives from the Nahuatl metl and zitli (Agave Hare).

Aztec mythology and religion
Aztec people
History of the Aztecs
Indigenous leaders of the Americas